is a railway station on the Hokuriku Railroad Ishikawa Line in the city of Kanazawa, Ishikawa Prefecture, Japan, operated by the private railway operator Hokuriku Railroad (Hokutetsu).

Lines

Station layout
The station consists of one side platform serving a single bi-directional track. The station is unattended.

Adjacent stations

History
Nishi-Izumi Station opened on 1 December 1934.

Surrounding area
 Kanazawa High School
 Kanazawa Fushimi High School
 Kanazawa Central High School
 Kanazawa Municipal Seisen Junior High School
 Kanazawa Nishi-Izumi Post Office
 Kanazawa City Fire Departments

See also
 List of railway stations in Japan

References

External links

 Nish-Izumi Station information 

Railway stations in Ishikawa Prefecture
Railway stations in Japan opened in 1934
Hokuriku Railroad Ishikawa Line